Petra Begerow (born 14 April 1975 in Bad Kreuznach) is a former German professional tennis player.

Career 
She reached her highest WTA singles ranking, 29, on 8 April 1996. She reached the second round of the French Open 4 times, 1994-1997. That was also her highest achievement in Grand Slam tournaments.

ITF Finals

Singles (2–1)

External links
 
 
 Munzinger site bio

1975 births
Living people
German female tennis players
People from Bad Kreuznach